Asif Raza (born 11 January 1987) is a Pakistani first-class cricketer who has played for Lahore cricket team and Kalutara Town Club.

References

External links
 

1987 births
Living people
Pakistani cricketers
Kalutara Town Club cricketers
Lahore cricketers
Cricketers from Lahore